Nilsen is a surname.

Nilsen may also refer to:

Mount Nilsen, Antarctica
Nilsen Peak, Antarctica
Nilsen Plateau, Antarctica
Nilsen Bay, Antarctica
Nilsen Island, near the island of South Georgia
Nilsen Township, Wilkin County, Minnesota